The Chommanard Book Prize is a literary award in Thailand which recognises female literary talent and is sponsored by the Bangkok Bank and Praphansarn Publishing House Co.

The inaugural prize in 2007 was awarded for a work of fiction.

In 2010, the theme was modern non-fiction and the prize was awarded to an autobiographical work.

Awards
2010 Thanadda Sawangduean, Chan Chue Eri: Kap Prasopkarn Tang Daen (I Am Eri: My Experience Overseas)
2007 Judy Chan, Roi Wasan (A walk through Spring)

See also

 List of literary awards honoring women

References

Thai literary awards
Literary awards honoring women
Awards established in 2007
2007 establishments in Thailand